Sowbhagyam is a 1993 Indian Malayalam film, directed by Sandhya Mohan and starring Sunitha and  Jagadish  in lead roles.

Plot

Balachandran a casual announcer in All India Radio gets engaged to Indhu,  daughter of Straightforward.  After marriage,  things become complicated when a drama artist Rajani accuses Balachandran of raping her.

Cast
Jagadheesh as Balachadran
 Sunitha as Indhu Balachadran 
 Suchitra as Koothttukulam Rejani
 Jagathy Sreekumar as Subramaniyan
 A. C. Zainuddin as Balachandran's colleague 
 TR Omana as Balachandran's mother 
 Priyanka as Reshmi Menon
 Rajan P. Dev as Narayanan Nair
 Kuthiravattam Pappu as Allamkodu Vasu
 Mala Aravindan as Karunan
 Krishnan Kutty Nair as Nanu Ashan	
 Aboobacker as Krishnan	
 Bobby Kottarakkara as Uppala Rajappan
 Chithra	 
 Divya Unni as Indu's sister
 Kanakalatha as Suseela Subramaniyan	
 Jose Pallissery as Irijalakuda Neelabaran	
 Kanakalatha
 Sathaar as Doctor 
 kaladi omana 
 Narayanankutty Member at the drama troup

Soundtrack 
The film's soundtrack contains 3 songs, all composed by S. P. Venkatesh and Lyrics by Kaithapram.

References

External links
 

1993 films
1990s Malayalam-language films
Films scored by S. P. Venkatesh